George Edward Hockette [Lefty] (April 7, 1908 – January 20, 1974) was a pitcher in Major League Baseball who played from 1934 through 1935 for the Boston Red Sox. He was born in Perth, Mississippi.

Over parts of two seasons, Hockette posted a 4–4 record with a 4.08 ERA in 26 appearances, including seven starts, three complete games, eight games finished, 25 strikeouts and 28 walks in 88⅓ innings of work. 
 
Hockette died in Plantation, Florida at age 65.

Sources
Baseball Reference

1908 births
1974 deaths
Boston Red Sox players
Major League Baseball pitchers
Baseball players from Mississippi
Minor league baseball managers
Buffalo Bisons (minor league) players
Hazleton Mountaineers players
Reading Red Sox players
Kansas City Blues (baseball) players
Syracuse Chiefs players
San Diego Padres (minor league) players
Birmingham Barons players
Knoxville Smokies players
People from Plantation, Florida
People from Jefferson County, Mississippi